Dry Creek may refer to:

 Arroyo (creek) – a type of dry creek
 Wadi – a type of dry creek, most commonly found in the Middle East

Communities
Australia
Dry Creek, South Australia, a suburb of Adelaide
Dry Creek railway station, a station in the Adelaide suburb of Dry Creek
United States
Dry Creek, Alaska, a census-designated place in the Southeast Fairbanks Census Area
Dry Creek, Louisiana, an unincorporated community in Beauregard Parish
Dry Creek, Oklahoma, a census-designated place in Cherokee County
Dry Creek, West Virginia, an unincorporated community in Raleigh County

Watercourses

Australia
Dry Creek (Australian Capital Territory), a tributary of Gudgenby River
Dry Creek (Bylong River tributary), a tributary of Bylong River
Dry Creek (Krui River tributary), a tributary of Krui River, in New South Wales
Dry Creek (South Australia), a seasonal stream in South Australia

Canada
Dry Creek (Lake Erie), a watershed administered by the Long Point Region Conservation Authority, that drains into Lake Erie

United States
In California:
Dry Creek (Butte County), flowing into the Sacramento River via the Cherokee Canal; see California State Route 149
Dry Creek (Fresno County, California); see List of dams and reservoirs in California
Dry Creek (Mokelumne River tributary), in Amador, San Joaquin, and Sacramento Counties
Dry Creek (Steelhead Creek tributary), (a Sacramento River tributary) in Placer and Sacramento Counties
Dry Creek (San Mateo County, California), a tributary of Tunitas Creek
Dry Creek (Sonoma County, California), a tributary of the Russian River
Dry Creek (Tuolumne River tributary), in Stanislaus County, California
Dry Creek (near Woodside, California), a tributary of Bear Creek in San Mateo County
Dry Creek (Yuba River tributary), a tributary of Yuba River
Dry Creek (Georgia)
Dry Creek (Kentucky), a tributary of the Ohio River
In Minnesota:
Dry Creek (Big Piney River tributary), a stream in Minnesota
Dry Creek (Cottonwood River tributary), a stream in Minnesota
In Missouri:
Dry Creek (Big Creek tributary), a stream in Missouri
Dry Creek (Big River (Missouri)), a tributary of the Big River, located in Washington and St. Francois Counties
Dry Creek (Flat Creek tributary), a stream in Missouri
Dry Creek (Flat River tributary), a stream in St. Francois County
Dry Creek (Huzzah Creek tributary), a stream in Missouri
Dry Creek (James River tributary), a stream in Missouri
Dry Creek (Jefferson County, Missouri), a tributary of the Big River, located in Jefferson County
Dry Creek (Twelvemile Creek tributary), a stream in Missouri
Dry Brook, a tributary of the Paulins Kill in Sussex County, New Jersey
Dry Creek (Haw River tributary), a stream in Chatham County, North Carolina
Dry Creek (Cape Fear River tributary), a stream in Harnett County, North Carolina
In Oregon:
Dry Creek (Crooked Creek tributary), a tributary of Crooked Creek in Oregon
Dry Creek (Oregon), several other streams in Oregon
Dry Creek (Martins Creek tributary), a stream in Pennsylvania
Dry Creek (Tennessee River tributary)
Dry Creek (Hyco River tributary), a stream in Halifax County, Virginia

Other uses
Australia
 Dry Creek railway station, near Adelaide, South Australia
United States
 Dry Creek (RTD), a transit station in Centennial, Colorado
 Dry Creek Airpark, a private-use airport in Prineville, Oregon
 Dry Creek Archeological Site, a National Historic Landmark in Alaska
 Dry Creek Joint Elementary School District, in California
 Dry Creek School (Manhattan, Montana), a historic one-room schoolhouse
 Dry Creek Valley AVA, a wine region in Sonoma County, California

See also 
 Big Dry Creek (disambiguation)
 Dry Fork (disambiguation)
 Dry River (disambiguation)
 Dry Run (disambiguation)
 Dry (disambiguation)
 Dry Brook (disambiguation)